The eRuf Model A is a late-2000s all-electric concept sports car built by German automobile manufacturer Ruf Automobile. The car was powered by a UQM Technologies propulsion system (a UQM PowerPhase 150). During coasting the engine works as a generator producing electricity to charge the batteries.

If a production car were to be built, it would be able to use a clutchless one- or two-speed transmission with no reverse gear as the electric motor can spin forward or in reverse. Ruf engaged Calmotors in Camarillo, California, specialized in the implementation of hybrid electric and electric only powertrain design, to combine the latest generation of lithium-ion batteries with its motor.

Ruf announced that it hoped to begin production of the eRuf in the fall of 2009. This did not happen, and at the 2009 Geneva Motor Show, Ruf announced a new model, the eRUF Greenster, with limited production planned to commence at the end of 2010.

References

External links
Racing Around Lithium-Ion Style in Ruf's Electric 911 Edmunds.com 30 November 2008
Porsche, Unhappy With eRuf, Places an Order for a Tesla Roadster to Study It Green Car Advisor, Edmunds.com, 25 November 2008
Ruf Automobile's electric Porsche concept gets real, pictured Engadget 10 October 2008
Road and Track tests battery-powered E-Ruf 911 Autoblog Green 21 October 2008

Ruf vehicles
Electric concept cars
Electric sports cars
Cars introduced in 2008